Sandy Nunes Leal (born 1972) is an American lawyer and judge. She is a California judge who is a former nominee to be a United States district judge of the United States District Court for the Central District of California.

Early life and education 
She was born in 1972 in Longview, Washington. Leal earned her Bachelor of Arts from the University of Washington and her Juris Doctor from Boston College Law School.

Legal career 
In 1997 she was a summer intern for Massachusetts District Magistrate Judge Marianne B. Bowler. In 1998 she was a summer law clerk in the Office of the Attorney General of Washington. Before joining the United States Attorney's Office, Leal was an Assistant District Counsel in the Department of Justice Immigration and Naturalization Service, where she was in the Attorney General's Honors Program. She was a Deputy Chief in the United States Attorney's Office for the Central District of California, where she served as an Assistant United States Attorney from 2004 to 2018.

State court service 

Since 2018, she has been a Judge on the Orange County Superior Court to mixed reviews.

Expired nomination to district court 

On August 28, 2019, President Trump announced his intent to nominate Leal to serve as a United States district judge for the United States District Court for the Central District of California. On October 17, 2019, her nomination was sent to the Senate. President Trump nominated Leal to the seat vacated by Judge Christina A. Snyder, who took senior status on November 23, 2016. On January 3, 2020, her nomination was returned to the President under Rule XXXI, Paragraph 6 of the United States Senate. On February 13, 2020, her renomination was sent to the Senate. On January 3, 2021, her nomination was returned to the President under Rule XXXI, Paragraph 6 of the United States Senate.

References

External links 

United States Senate Committee on the Judiciary Questionnaire for Judicial Nominees 

1972 births
Living people
20th-century American lawyers
21st-century American lawyers
21st-century American judges
Assistant United States Attorneys
Boston College Law School alumni
California lawyers
California state court judges
People from Longview, Washington
Superior court judges in the United States
United States Department of Justice lawyers
University of Washington alumni
20th-century American women lawyers
21st-century American women lawyers
21st-century American women judges